Lichfield Trent Valley is a railway station on the outskirts of the city of Lichfield in Staffordshire, England. It is one of two stations in Lichfield, the other being  in the city-centre. It is a split-level station, with low level platforms served by the Trent Valley section of the West Coast Main Line, and a single high level platform, which is the northern terminus of the Cross-City Line.

Location
The station is located 1 mile north-east from the city-centre and serves the east and north side of the city. It is also being used by commuters from surrounding villages, such as Fradley, Alrewas and Whittington. The station bears the name Trent Valley, as the line on the lower level was opened by the Trent Valley Railway, which ran between Rugby and Stafford. The River Trent is found around 6 miles north of Lichfield Trent Valley at Wynchnor Junction, where it is joined by two of its tributaries, the River Tame and the River Mease.

Access to the station is from the A5127. The station serves as a connecting station for travellers wishing to get to Birmingham on the Cross-City Line.

Features

The station's low-level platforms are located on the Trent Valley Line section of the West Coast Main Line (WCML). Facilities are basic – the original station buildings on the low-level platforms were demolished in 1969 and replaced with a basic wooden building and shelter.

Above this, a single platform at a right-angle to the low-level platforms, forms the high-level part of the station. This is the northern terminus of the Cross-City Line, which passes over the WCML on a bridge. The high-level platform is connected by stairs from the low-level platforms and also serves as a footbridge for passenger access to the southbound low-level platform. Passenger lifts were installed here in June 2020 to allow for step free access between the lower and upper platforms.

North of the high-level station, the line continues to Wychnor Junction, where it joins the Cross Country Route towards Derby. This stretch of line remains open for freight trains, empty stock transfers to the nearby Central Rivers TMD and occasional diversions, but no longer has a regular advertised passenger service. One or two trains a day between Birmingham and Derby use this route without stopping instead of going via Tamworth for operational reasons. One platform of the high-level station was reopened as the northern terminus of the Cross City Line in 1988 by British Rail, with southbound services to Birmingham, Longbridge and Redditch only. A single track chord connects the low and high level lines at the north of the station, but is rarely used.

Services

West Coast Main Line
In the current (May 2022) timetable there is a basic daytime frequency of one train per hour each way (including Sundays) – southbound to  via  and northbound to  via . These services are operated by London Northwestern Railway. Avanti West Coast services call in the weekday peaks. It is envisaged for services from Lichfield Trent Valley to Macclesfield and Manchester Piccadilly to start in the future as part of a possible direct award of the West Coast Partnership franchise.

Cross City Line
On Sundays the service typically terminates at Redditch serving all stations en route. All Cross City Line services are operated by West Midlands Trains with local Transport for West Midlands services operated Class 323 electrical multiple units with an average journey time to Birmingham New Street of around 41 minutes and to Longbridge of around 1 hour 5 minutes.

History

In the meantime, the L&BR, GJR and Manchester and Birmingham Railway had amalgamated in July 1846 as the London and North Western Railway (LNWR), which itself absorbed the TVR later in 1846. This first station at Lichfield was built in 1847. This station was situated north of Burton Road approximately 0.2 miles north of the current crossing point. The architect, John William Livock, built the station in a Tudor Gothic style.

The line north of  opened on 9 April 1849, but the station named Lichfield Trent Valley Junction was not opened until August 1849. Lichfield Trent Valley Junction was built south of Burton Road close to Streethay just past the present signal box. From it a spur line descended to the other station north of the crossing point to allow passengers to transfer to the LNWR main line below. The SSR was leased to the LNWR in February 1861, and was absorbed by that company on 15 July 1867.

On 3 July 1871, both of these stations were closed by the LNWR, they were replaced with a single station; Lichfield Trent Valley was built in its present location with high and low-level platforms adjoining each other. On 28 November 1988, the service between Birmingham and Lichfield City was extended, and initially both of the High Level platforms at Lichfield Trent Valley were reopened as a terminus, with steps leading up to both sides from the low level platforms. At that time the service was hourly, and the diesel units were shunted as empty coaching stock North from the Down Walsall platform to just past the high level signalbox. There they would be crossed over to the Up Walsall line and proceed into the up platform. These workings remained in place until the now current trailing crossover just south of the high level platform was opened during the electrification and upgrading of the line in 1992. Once the new trailing crossing had been commissioned, the Up Walsall platform was closed, and the electric trains terminated in the Down Walsall platform without requiring a shunt move to reverse.

The signal box was demolished over the weekend of 15 June 2008 as part of the West Coast upgrade.

In December 2013, work started on an upgrade to the station, this included the opening of an additional car park in February 2014, and the construction of a new station building.

1946 accident

On New Year's Day 1946, the station was the site of a points failure resulting in an express fish train from Fleetwood to London Broad Street being diverted into a stationary local passenger train standing in the up platform loop, resulting in the deaths of 20 people and injury of 21 more. The disaster is one of the very rare cases in the UK that involved a mechanical point interlocking failing to prevent an accident.

Notes

References

External links 

Rail Around Birmingham and the West Midlands: Lichfield Trent Valley station

Railway stations in Staffordshire
DfT Category E stations
Lichfield
Railway stations in Great Britain opened in 1847 
Railway stations in Great Britain opened in 1849 
Railway stations in Great Britain closed in 1871 
Railway stations in Great Britain opened in 1871 
Former London and North Western Railway stations
Railway stations served by West Midlands Trains
Railway stations served by Avanti West Coast
1847 establishments in England
John William Livock buildings
Stations on the West Coast Main Line